Alexis Castro may refer to:

 Alexis Castro (footballer, born 1984), Argentine footballer for Aldosivi, on loan from Newell's Old Boys
 Alexis Castro (footballer, born 1994), Argentine footballer for San Lorenzo de Almagro